María Beatriz Padrón Salazar (born 5 April 2003) is a Costa Rican swimmer who competed in the 200 meter freestyle event at the 2020 Summer Olympics. She also competed at the 2018 Summer Youth Olympics in the 100 meter freestyle, 50 meter butterfly, and 100 meter butterfly.

References 

Living people
2003 births
Costa Rican female swimmers
Olympic swimmers of Costa Rica
Swimmers at the 2020 Summer Olympics
Swimmers at the 2018 Summer Youth Olympics